Turning Point is a 2012 drama film written and directed by Niyi Towolawi and starring Jackie Appiah, K.D. Aubert, Todd Bridges, Ernie Hudson, Patience Ozokwor, with Igoni Archibong in leading role of "Ade". It received 2 nominations at the 9th Africa Movie Academy Awards.

Plot 
Ade (Igoni Archibong) is a playboy Nigerian-American investment banker working at a successful firm in New York City. He is in a relationship with keen-to-marry African-American Stacey (KD Aubert). Her family (Ernie Hudson, Cynda Williams) had been cautious of this "African" but begins to warm to him due to his professional success and charm.

However, Ade's manipulative mother (Patience Ozokwor) back in Nigeria would rather her son gets serious and dumps "that girl with no traceable roots" in favour of a wife from within her social circle. He is tricked into visiting Nigeria only to discover an arranged marriage had already been conducted on his behalf with a complete stranger. Reluctantly, Ade accepts the new wife, Grace (Jackie Appiah), since she is beautiful and seems submissive.

Back in the US, Ade avoids Stacey until she crudely discovers his secret marriage. Grace quickly settles into the American lifestyle, living as a kept woman while Ade continues to enjoy the freedom of a bachelor.

Grace eventually tires of Ade's behaviour and confronts him, setting off a series of battles that makes Ade realise how easily his enviable lifestyle could be taken away. With the going tough and friends thin, Ade decides to mount a final showdown that will be a turning point for everyone.

Cast
 Igoni Archibong as Ade
 Jackie Appiah as Grace
 K.D. Aubert as Stacey
 Todd Bridges as Marvin
 Joe Estevez as The Boss
 Ernie Hudson as Mr Johnson
 Enyinna Nwigwe as Steve
 Oge Okoye as Ebony
 Patience Ozokwor as Ade's Mum
 Cynda Williams as Mrs Johnson
 Tim Duquette as Client #1
 Gerald Yelverton as Jason

See also
 List of Nigerian films of 2012

References

External links
 
 

Nigerian drama films
English-language Nigerian films
2012 drama films
2012 films
Films set in New York City
American drama films
2010s English-language films
2010s American films